Thomas Pöge (sometimes shown as Thomas Poege, born 6 May 1979) is a German bobsledder who has competed since 2002. He won the bronze medal in the four-man event at the 2008 FIBT World Championships in Altenberg, Germany.

References
FIBT profile (as Thomas Poege)

1979 births
German male bobsledders
Living people
Place of birth missing (living people)